Ricardo Lucas Ramos (born August 1, 1995) is a Brazilian mixed martial artist who competes in the Featherweight division of the Ultimate Fighting Championship (UFC).

Background
Growing up in Campinas, São Paulo, Brazil, Ramos often got into fights in his teens. His father placed him in Brazilian jiu-jitsu classes, but eventually kicked him out of the home at the age of 14. According to Ramos, he stayed at the mixed martial arts gym from that point to the age of 21.

Mixed martial arts career

Early career
Ramos made his professional MMA debut in 2012. For the first two years of his career he fought exclusively in his native Brazil and amassed a record of 6 wins and no losses. He made his North American debut in 2015, fighting three times for Legacy FC before it re-branded to Legacy Fighting Alliance. Before joining the UFC, he had a record of 9 wins and 1 loss; all but one of his wins came via stoppage before the final bell.

Ramos was featured on Dana White's Lookin' for a Fight reality show when he submitted Alfred Khashakyan to earn himself a UFC contract.

Ultimate Fighting Championship
Ramos made his promotional debut at UFC Fight Night 104 against Michinori Tanaka. Ramos won via unanimous decision.

Ramos returned at UFC 217 taking on Aiemann Zahabi. Ramos won via knockout in the third round. He was awarded his first Performance of the Night bonus.

Ramos faced Kang Kyung-ho on August 4, 2018 at UFC 227. He won the fight by split decision.

Ramos was expected to face Ricky Simón on November 10, 2018 at UFC Fight Night 139. However, it was reported on October 16, 2018 that Ramos was pulled from the bout due to hand injury.

Ramos faced Said Nurmagomedov on February 2, 2019 at UFC Fight Night 144. He lost the fight via TKO in the first round.

Ramos was expected to face Sergio Pettis on June 29, 2019 at UFC on ESPN 3.  However, on June 15, 2019 it was reported that Pettis pulled out of the bout citing injury, and he was replaced by newcomer Journey Newson. He won the fight via unanimous decision.

Ramos faced Luiz Eduardo Garagorri in a featherweight bout on November 16, 2019 at UFC on ESPN+ 22. He won the fight via a rear-naked choke in round one. This win earned him the Performance of the Night award.

Ramos faced Lerone Murphy on July 16, 2020 at UFC on ESPN: Kattar vs. Ige. He lost the fight via technical knockout in round one.

Ramos was scheduled to face Zubaira Tukhugov on March 13, 2021 at UFC Fight Night 187. A week before the event, Tukhugov pulled out due to undisclosed reasons. Promotion officials elected to remove Ramos from the event.

Ramos was scheduled to face Bill Algeo on April 17, 2021 at UFC on ESPN 22. However, Ramos was pulled from the fight during the week leading up to the event due to COVID-19 protocols. The bout was cancelled, and was rescheduled for UFC Fight Night 188. Ramos won the close bout via unanimous decision. Seven MMA media outlets gave it to Ramos and six media outlets gave it to Algeo.

The bout with Tukhugov was rescheduled and took place on October 30, 2021 at UFC 267. He lost the bout via unanimous decision.

Ramos faced Danny Chavez at UFC on ESPN: Kattar vs. Emmett on June 18, 2022. He won the bout in the first round, knocking out Chavez with a spinning back elbow. This win earned him his third Performance of the Night award.

Ramos was expected to face Danny Henry on September 3, 2022 at UFC Fight Night 209. However, the bout was cancelled after Henry withdrew for unknown reasons.

Ramos was expected to face Austin Lingo in a featherweight bout on March 11, 2023 at UFC Fight Night 221. At the weigh-ins, Ramos came in at 154 pounds, eight pounds over the featherweight non-title fight limit. As a result, his bout with Lingo was cancelled.

Championships and achievements

Mixed martial arts
Elite Fighting Championship 
 EFC Bantamweight Championship (One Time)
 Ultimate Fighting Championship
Performance of the Night (Three times)

Mixed martial arts record

|-
|Win
|align=center|16–4
|Danny Chavez
|KO (spinning back elbow)
|UFC on ESPN: Kattar vs. Emmett
|
|align=center|1
|align=center|1:12
|Austin, Texas, United States
|
|-
|Loss
|align=center|15–4
|Zubaira Tukhugov
|Decision (unanimous)
|UFC 267
|
|align=center|3
|align=center|5:00
|Abu Dhabi, United Arab Emirates
|  
|-
|Win
|align=center|15–3
|Bill Algeo
|Decision (unanimous)
|UFC Fight Night: Font vs. Garbrandt
|
|align=center|3
|align=center|5:00
|Las Vegas, Nevada, United States
|
|-
|Loss
|align=center|14–3
|Lerone Murphy
|TKO (punches)
|UFC on ESPN: Kattar vs. Ige
|
|align=center|1
|align=center|4:18
|Abu Dhabi, United Arab Emirates
|
|-
|Win
|align=center|14–2
|Luiz Eduardo Garagorri
| Submission (rear-naked choke)
|UFC Fight Night: Błachowicz vs. Jacaré
|
|align=center|1 
|align=center|3:57
|São Paulo, Brazil
| 
|-
|Win
|align=center|13–2
|Journey Newson
|Decision (unanimous)
|UFC on ESPN: Ngannou vs. dos Santos
|
|align=center|3
|align=center|5:00
|Minneapolis, Minnesota, United States
|
|-
|Loss
|align=center|12–2
|Said Nurmagomedov
|TKO (spinning back kick and punches)
|UFC Fight Night: Assunção vs. Moraes 2
|
|align=center|1
|align=center|2:28
|Fortaleza, Brazil 
|
|-
|Win
|align=center|12–1
|Kang Kyung-ho
|Decision (split)
|UFC 227
|
|align=center|3
|align=center|5:00
|Los Angeles, California, United States
|
|-
|Win
|align=center|11–1
|Aiemann Zahabi
|KO (spinning back elbow)
|UFC 217
|November 4, 2017
|align=center|3
|align=center|1:58
|New York City, New York, United States
|
|-
|Win
|align=center|10–1
|Michinori Tanaka
|Decision (unanimous)
|UFC Fight Night: Bermudez vs. The Korean Zombie
|February 4, 2017
|align=center|3
|align=center|5:00
|Houston, Texas, United States
|
|-
|Win
|align=center|9–1
|Alfred Khashakyan
|Submission (rear-naked choke)
|NEF: Lookin' for a Fight
|August 5, 2016
|align=center|2
|align=center|2:10
|Bangor, Maine, United States
|
|-
|Loss
|align=center|8–1
|Manny Vazquez
|Submission (rear-naked choke)
|Legacy FC 51
|February 5, 2016
|align=center|1
|align=center|1:45
|Hinckley, Minnesota, United States
|
|-
|Win
|align=center|8–0
|Cody Walker
|Submission (triangle armbar)
|Legacy FC 46
|October 2, 2015
|align=center|1
|align=center|2:39
|Allen, Texas, United States
|
|-
|Win
|align=center|7–0
|Justin Rader
|TKO (punches)
|Legacy FC 41
|April 3, 2015
|align=center|1
|align=center|0:32
|Tulsa, Oklahoma, United States
|
|-
|Win
|align=center|6–0
|Fabio Lima
|Submission (triangle choke)
|MMA Super Heroes 4
|May 30, 2014
|align=center|3
|align=center|1:49
|Valinhos, Brazil
|
|-
|Win
|align=center|5–0
|Rafael Correa
|Submission (rear-naked choke)
|Talent MMA Circuit 8: Valinhos 2014
|April 12, 2014
|align=center|1
|align=center|2:38
|São Paulo, Brazil
|
|-
|Win
|align=center|4–0
|Lucas Mascena
|Submission (armbar)
|Talent MMA Circuit 5: Campinas 2013
|November 23, 2013
|align=center|1
|align=center|1:59
|Campinas, Brazil
|
|-
|Win
|align=center|3–0
|Allan Nascimento
|Decision (unanimous)
|Elite FC 5: Night of Champions
|October 5, 2013
|align=center|3
|align=center|5:00
|Campinas, Brazil
|
|-
|Win
|align=center|2–0
|William Oliveira
|TKO (knee and punches)
|Supreme FC
|December 1, 2012
|align=center|1
|align=center|0:30
|Campinas, Brazil
|
|-
|Win
|align=center|1–0
|Josivaldo Moreno
|Submission (triangle choke)
|CT Fight
|May 19, 2012
|align=center|1
|align=center|0:58
|Indaiatuba, Brazil
|
|-

See also
List of current UFC fighters
List of male mixed martial artists

References

External links
 
 

Living people
1995 births
Sportspeople from Campinas
Brazilian male mixed martial artists
Bantamweight mixed martial artists
Featherweight mixed martial artists
Mixed martial artists utilizing Brazilian jiu-jitsu
Ultimate Fighting Championship male fighters
Brazilian practitioners of Brazilian jiu-jitsu
People awarded a black belt in Brazilian jiu-jitsu